Tetragonoderus fasciatus is a species of beetle in the family Carabidae. It was described by Haldeman in 1843.

References

fasciatus
Beetles described in 1843